Lodhi arts district which is the first's art district of India. Which is located at Lodhi Road, New Delhi.

References 

Arts districts
Arts centres in India
New Delhi